The Deccan white carp (Cirrhinus fulungee) is a species of freshwater cyprinid fish native to Karnataka and Maharashtra in India initially but later to other states after the construction of dams. It is currently widely distributed across the states of Maharashtra, Karnataka, Telangana, Andhra Pradesh, Chhattisgarh, and Madhya Pradesh.

The species can attain a length of 30 cm. It is used for food but does not support large fisheries. It is often sold in local markets.

References

Cirrhinus
Fish described in 1839